Branislav "Branko" Milićević (born 6 May 1946), also known by his stage name Branko Kockica (Branko the Little Cube), is a Serbian actor known for his roles in children's TV shows.

Early life 
Born in Zemun, at the time in Yugoslavia, he became a singer in his childhood. He later became famous for his work on a television series for children entitled Kocka, kocka, kockica (Cube, Cube, Cubelet) which was on the air for several decades on TV Belgrade.

Cube, Cube, Cubelet 
In 1974, on Belgrade TV (Channel 1), Branko started the children TV series Kocka, kocka, kockica (Cube, Cube, Cubelet). Over the next twenty years 250 episodes were shown, terminating in 1994. In 2003 several new episodes were released in order to try to revive the show, but it never reached the popularity of the original series.

In 1979, the series won first prize at the Educational TV Festival in Japan.

“The Snail” theatre 
“The Snail” theatre was established in 1977 by Milićević and his wife Slobodanka (Caca) Aleksić.

References

External links 

 The Snail theatre
 www.blic.rs Uz malisane 33 godine

1946 births
Living people
People from Zemun
Male actors from Belgrade
Serbian male actors
University of Belgrade alumni
Serbian children's writers
Socialist Federal Republic of Yugoslavia
Television show creators